ISO/IEC 8859-14:1998, Information technology — 8-bit single-byte coded graphic character sets — Part 14: Latin alphabet No. 8 (Celtic), is part of the ISO/IEC 8859 series of ASCII-based standard character encodings, first edition published in 1998. It is informally referred to as Latin-8 or Celtic. It was designed to cover the Celtic languages, such as Irish, Manx, Scottish Gaelic, Welsh, Cornish, and Breton.

ISO-8859-14 is the IANA preferred charset name for this standard when supplemented with the C0 and C1 control codes from ISO/IEC 6429. CeltScript made an extension for Windows called Extended Latin-8. Microsoft has assigned code page 28604 a.k.a. Windows-28604 to ISO-8859-14.

History
ISO-8859-14 was originally proposed for the Sami languages. ISO 8859-12 was proposed for Celtic. Later, ISO 8859-12 was proposed for Devanagari, so the Celtic proposal was changed to ISO 8859-14. The Sami proposal was changed to ISO 8859-15, but it got rejected as an ISO/IEC 8859 part, although it was registered as ISO-IR-197.

The original proposal used a different arrangement of points 0xA1–BF. At the committee draft stage of the specification, a dotless i was included at 0xAE, which was changed to a registered trademark sign (matching ISO-8859-1) in the final publication.

ISO-IR-182, an earlier (registered in 1994) modification of ISO-8859-1, had added the letters Ẁ, Ẃ, Ẅ, Ỳ, Ÿ, Ŵ, Ŷ and their lowercase forms (except for ÿ, which was already included) for Welsh language use. The final published version of ISO-8859-14 includes these letters in the same positions which they appear at in ISO-IR-182.

Codepage layout
Differences from ISO-8859-1 have the Unicode code point number below the character.

Draft layout
The first draft had positions A0-BF different. It did not include the pilcrow sign, but included the cent sign instead at its Latin-1 position. Later, it was ruled that the pilcrow sign was more common, so the pilcrow sign remains at its Latin-1 position, and the cent sign was removed instead.

Differences from ISO-8859-14 have the Unicode code point below them.

References

External links
ISO/IEC 8859-14:1998
ISO-IR 199 Celtic Supplementary Latin Set (May 1, 1998, submitted by Irish body NSAI/AGITS/WG6)

ISO/IEC 8859
Computer-related introductions in 1998